Peter John Lawlor (born 8 May 1960 in Gowerton) is a Welsh former cricketer active in 1981 who played for Glamorgan. He appeared in one first-class match as a righthanded batsman who bowled off breaks. He scored eight runs and took one wicket.

Notes

1960 births
Welsh cricketers
Glamorgan cricketers
Living people
20th-century Welsh people